Figoli is a surname. Notable people with this surname include:

 Ernesto Fígoli (1888 –1951), nicknamed "Matucho", Uruguayan football manager
 Luigi Figoli, Italian bobsledder 
 Mateo Fígoli Martínez (born 1984), Italian-Uruguayan footballer
 Miguel Carlos Diab Figoli, Uruguayan basketball player

Italian-language surnames